Hydroxyoctadecadienoic acid may refer to:

 9-Hydroxyoctadecadienoic acid
 13-Hydroxyoctadecadienoic acid